The Shadow Play is a 1992 Turkish drama film directed by Yavuz Turgul.

Cast 
 Şener Şen - Abidin
 Şevket Altuğ - Mahmut
 Larissa Litichevskaya - Kumru
 
 Metin Çekmez - Ramazan

References

External links 

1992 drama films
1992 films
Films scored by Attila Özdemiroğlu
Turkish drama films
1990s Turkish-language films